Legacy of Evil is the sixth studio album by the Norwegian symphonic black metal band Limbonic Art.

Released by Nocturnal Art Productions and marketed and distributed by Candlelight Records. Recorded at MOF studios 2007 by Morfeus. Mastered by Tom Kvålsvoll at Strype Audio. Produced and mixed by Limbonic Art. All lyrics written by Daemon.

Track listing

Reception
CD Universe reviewed the album and gave it a positive score. It quotes:

Personnel
Daemon - guitars, bass, lead vocals, backing vocals
Morfeus - lead guitars, electronics, vocals
Tom Kvålsvoll - mastering

References

External links
Legacy of Evil at Nocturnal Art Productions

2007 albums
Limbonic Art albums